The Joint Social Welfare Institute (IMAS) is an autonomous institution with legal status in Costa Rica for welfare. It was created under Act 4760 of April 30, 1971, which put it into operation from May 8 of that year. Its purpose is to serve the population suffering poverty in Costa Rica through the provision of grants and programs.   

The institute uses the Social Information Sheet (Ficha de Información Social) (FIS) to conduct research and evaluate the population living in poverty. The FIS contains a set of fifty-six variables grouped into 10 sections.

External links

Institutions of Costa Rica
Law of Costa Rica